Wisma Nusantara is an office highrise building located in Jalan M.H. Thamrin, Jakarta, Indonesia. Constructed from 1964 to 1969, Wisma Nusantara was amongst the first highrise buildings in Indonesia. The building complex included the Pullman Hotel.

History
The construction of Wisma Nusantara was inspired by President Sukarno's intention to have the first high rise building in Jakarta. The first contract was awarded in 1964 for $5.7 million using the Japanese war reparation and construction commenced in the same year. However, the decline of the rupiah and the attempted coup d'etat interrupted the construction of Wisma Nusantara. As a result the money ran out, leaving the building unfinished with only its steel frame completed for more than 5 years.

Construction work was continued by Mitsui Construction Co. in 1972 after the renewal of the contract. Wiratman Wangsadinata, the founder of PT. Wiratman & Associates, was chosen as the supervisor of the project in 1970. The building was finally completed in 1972. It was officially inaugurated by President Suharto on December 2, 1972, together with the adjacent President Hotel (now Pullman Hotel). As part of the deal, the share was held by Mitsui 55% and the Indonesian Government 45%. Because of the considerably high cost of renting office space, the building was only used by Japanese companies for a couple of years. Because of this, the building stimulated the antipathy of Indonesian citizens. The building was at one time topped with a large sign of Suzuki. An Indonesian movie directed by Sjumandjaja Budak Nafsu (1984), literally "slave to lust", depicts a scene where a young woman was raped and made a concubine for the Japanese during the war, and having lost her energy for life, wanders around Jakarta surrounded by neon signs of Japanese enterprises on Jalan M.H. Thamrin, which clearly shows sentiment toward the Japanese in Indonesia during the period.

The first major renovation was done in 1990 which consist of JICA building construction. The connecting bridge between Wisma Nusantara office building and the hotel (then known as Nikko Hotel) was built in 2002. In 2003, Nikko Hotel was expanded with an additional 11-story executive suite tower to the north of the Wisma Nusantara complex. This hotel tower was designed by Kenzo Tange International. In 2005, the Annex Building was completed to accommodate parking.

Design
Wisma Nusantara was constructed with a steel frame and a caisson foundation for resistance to earthquakes.

References

Cited works

Office buildings completed in 1972
Buildings and structures in Jakarta
Skyscraper office buildings in Indonesia